Brutalism is a literary movement formed in 2006 by three writers from the north of England (Tony O'Neill, Adelle Stripe and Ben Myers).

The Brutalists are affiliated with the Offbeat generation, a loose association of like-minded writers working across different styles but united by their opposition to a mainstream publishing industry driven by marketing departments.

The movement may have been the first literary movement to be launched via the social networking site Myspace.

Brutalist works include Digging the Vein, Down and Out on Murder Mile, Seizure Wet Dreams, and Songs from the Shooting Gallery by Tony O'Neill, Some Things Are Better Left Unsaid and Cigarettes in Bed by Adelle Stripe, and The Book of Fuck, Richard: A Novel and Pig Iron by Ben Myers.

Their debut publication Nowhere Fast was released as a chapbook on Captains of Industry Press in 2007.

Brutalism 2 Cheap Thrills was released in summer 2009 as part of Mineshaft Magazine, where a new collection of Brutalist poems featured alongside unpublished work by Robert Crumb and Charles Bukowski.

Further reading

Article about The Brutalists on The Guardian online edition
Wrecking Ball Press, the UK Publishers of 'The Book of Fuck' and 'Digging The Vein
Article about The Brutalists and Offbeat Generation on The Guardian online edition
Captains of Industry Press, UK publishers of The Brutalists

External links
The Brutalists at Myspace

British literary movements